SNT Gradostroitel is the private cottage village (dacha) located nearby Nikolina Gora 25 km north west to Moscow in Moscow Oblast, Russia. Population: 250

History
The community has existed since the second part of the 20th century, and was established back in 1968. The village's name is based on a Russian word "Gradostroitel" (architect, urban planner); First settlers were architects, developers and military people. Major renovations started in 1994 when an asphalt road was created from Nikolina Gora straight to the village.

In the beginning of the 2000s water pipes & electricity systems have been replaced with new systems. A new gas system had been deployed in the village for selected households enabling permanent living in both winter months as well as in summer months. With landlines connected to several houses Internet access became available to the Gradostroitel citizens.

Geography
Gradostroitel' is bordered by Nikolina Gora to the south and SNT Lira to the north. Unincorporated federal woods area lies to the west and east.

Government and politics
Gradostroitel' has a non-partisan chairman-board form of government, with the chairman and several board members elected at large for staggered two-year terms. The last chairman, Svetlana Mishina, had been in office since 2009. The current one, Lubov' Ovcharova, won the last elections back in Summer of 2011, though there are rumors that those elections were fabricated.

Current Chair
Lubov' Ovcharova is Gradostroitel's latest chairman. She started her first term as Chair on July, 2011 after previously serving on Gradostroitel's town accountant for a 2-year contract and was first time elected in 2011.

Current Village Board members
Board members are elected to two-year terms. All board seats are at large. Election candidates can declare for a particular position (infrastructure, land, or other officers) but are not required to.
 Lubov' Ovcharova; she is the current chairman.
 Svetlana Mishina (third term - served as board member in 2007–2009, and as both board member and chairman in 2009–2011).
 Nikolai Karmanov (third term - served as both board member and chairman in 2003-2005 & 2005–2007).

Current Employees
 Valery Tatishev - responsible for the gas infrastructure (since Jan 01, 2011).

Revision Committee
Revision Committee is a group usually consisting of 3 village members (with voting rights) who are reporting only to the group of all members of the village, known as "Assembly" . Its role is to make an independent review of all activities made by the Board and chairman and report on any issues and problems found back to the Assembly.

Demographics
As of the census of 2011, there were 250+ people, 134 households, and 134+ families residing in the village.

Real estate
Since mid-1990s nearly 50 properties sold in the Gradostroitel'.

At the end of the 20th century a clean property (with infrastructure available at the border of the property) was starting at $20,000 (end of the 1990s); in the next ten years lots of properties have been sold and new cottages (ready for permanent living) have been built; there are currently 2 or 3 properties at sale with approximate price of $400,000-$500,000. Prices are historically high due to not only a small distance to the Moscow city (25 km), but to close proximity to Nikolina Gora and the well-known Rublevo-Uspenskoe highway. A renovated infrastructure, including electricity, water (available during autumn, winter & spring months in addition to summer months), and gas, as well as the woods surrounding the village made the property cost relatively high.

References

Dachas
Odintsovsky District